Procerites is an extinct genus from a well-known class of fossil cephalopods, the ammonites. It lived during the Jurassic Period.

Distribution
Jurassic of China, France, Germany, Iran and Saudi Arabia

References

Jurassic ammonites
Jurassic animals of Asia
Jurassic animals of Europe